Lorraine (D657) is an Aquitaine-class frigate of the French Navy which were developed through the FREMM multipurpose frigate program. She is the second of two air-defence variants of the class known as FREMM DA (Frégate Européenne Multimissions de Défense Aérienne) in the program.

Development and design 
In November 2005 France announced a contract of €3.5 billion for development and the first eight hulls, with options for nine more costing €2.95 billion split over two tranches (totaling 17).

Following the cancellation of the third and fourth of the s in 2005 on budget grounds, requirements for an air-defence derivative of the FREMM called FREDA were placed – with DCNS coming up with several proposals. Expectations were that the last two ships of the 17 FREMM planned would be built to FREDA specifications; however, by 2008 the plan was revised down to just 11 FREMM (9 ASW variants and 2 FREDA variants) at a cost of €8.75 billion (FY13, ~US$12 billion). The 11 ships would cost €670 million (~US$760m) each in FY2014, or €860m (~US$980m) including development costs. Subsequently, the class was further reduced to a total of eight ships, though both air defence variants were retained. 

Lorraine is the second of two FREMM frigates built to FREDA specifications, alongside . Lorraine and her sister ship retain most of the armaments and sensors of their ASW sister ships within the FREMM class. However, the ships have enhancements related to air defence including a more powerful Thales Herakles multi-function radar with more transmitter modules and additional wave-forms and search modes for long range air defence. Additional communications systems, consoles in the combat information centre and berthings for additional personnel are also integrated into the ship. A reinforced bridge structure is incorporated to accommodate the enhanced weight of these systems. The ships also incorporate Sylver A50 vertical launch systems permitting them to carry both MBDA Aster 15 and/or 30 surface-to-air missiles. On the two AAW variants, the Sylver A70 launch systems (used for land-attack cruise missiles on the ASW variants) are removed to provide space for fitting double the number of A50 cells for Aster SAMs.

Construction and career 
Lorraine was developed as part of a joint Italian-French program known as FREMM, which was implemented to develop a new class of frigates for use by various European navies. Formally laid down in 2019, the frigate Lorraine was launched at the Lorient shipyard on 13 November 2020. She began sea trials in February 2022 and was delivered to the French Navy on 16 November 2022. In late 2022 she began a period of testing and exercises prior to being accepted into full operational service.

References 

Ships built in France
2020 ships
Aquitaine-class frigates